Kuruáya is a nearly extinct Tupian language of the state of Pará, in the Amazon region of Brazil.

References

External links 
 

Tupian languages
Endangered Tupian languages